Taħt Tliet Saltniet is a novel in Maltese by Ġużè Aquilina, published for the first time in 1938, then published again in 1945, 1969, 1978, 1997 and in 2003.

With Aquilina's novel Taħt Tliet Saltnet, he wrote using the orthographic system designed by the Akkademja tal-Malti (at the time it was known as l-Għaqda tal-Kittieba tal-Malti (Maltese Authors Society)) and chose to write in the Semitic form rather in romance form to build this characteristic that Maltese is a European language. Apart from this linguistic mission, Aquilina also had an ideological term.

In the mixture of History and inventions of historic literature novel, he made conditions and aspects from human life to build to the reader opinions in favour of Maltese history.

The story
The era that happened the events of the novel Taħt Tliet Saltniet was years of revolution. In America, the fight for freedom broke the chains of servilism. In France, one of the most bloody revolution was finished and throughout all of Europe, the shout for justice and equality had been heard across one kingdom after another. In Malta of the Knights of St John period, this shout was also heard.

This novel of Professor Aquilina is written on this idea. Alessandru Habela, the son of baroness Isabella, fell in love with Pawlina, an 18-year-old youth, the daughter of the farmer Pawlu ta' Menzju. Once on the way, Alessandru saw Pina, a poor lady that was going to die. Without thinking twice, he entered his mother's house and was going to take care of her, but she died after few days. For his mother and for the other nobel persons like her this act was one of the greatest scandals. Isabella shouted very much about this act, and sent his son Alessandru out of the house and took off his nobility title. Alessandru then began to live like the child, of a farmer that cultivates fields, from the things that he grew in the fields, providing food for others.

References

Maltese literature
Maltese-language literature